Guarumal may refer to:
Guarumal, Veraguas, Panama
Guarumal, Chiriquí, Panama